Gorrie may refer to:

Surname:
Alan Gorrie (born 1946), Scottish bassist, guitarist, keyboardist and singer
Dave Gorrie (born 1930), American former UC Santa Barbara and Pepperdine Head Baseball Coach
Donald Gorrie (born 1933), Scottish Liberal Democrat politician, and former Member of the Scottish Parliament
John Gorrie (disambiguation), multiple people
Veronica Gorrie (born 1971/1972), Aboriginal Australian writer

Given name:
Charles Gorrie Wynne (1911–1999), significant figure in optical lens design

Places:
Gorrie Airfield, Royal Australian Air Force airfield north of Larrimah, Northern Territory, Australia during World War II
Gorrie, Ontario, an urban community in Huron County, Ontario
Gorrie Lake (Ontario), lake in Timiskaming District, Ontario, Canada, east of Temagami

See also
Arthur Gorrie Correctional Centre, prison located on the Ipswich Motorway at Wacol in the western suburbs of Brisbane, Australia
Brasfield & Gorrie, privately held construction management, general contracting, and design-build service provider
John Gorrie Memorial Bridge carries US 98 and US 319 over the Apalachicola Bay, connecting Apalachicola with Eastpoint
John Gorrie State Museum, Florida State Park located in Apalachicola, a block off U.S. 98